You Told Your Mama Not to Worry is the twentieth studio album by South African musician Hugh Masekela. It was recorded in Kumasi, Ghana, and released on 9 November 1977 via Casablanca Records label.

Background
The album includes the song "Soweto Blues" performed by Miriam Makeba. The song is about the Soweto uprising against apartheid that occurred in 1976. The songs "You Told Your Mama Not to Worry" and "Mami Wata" were re-released on CD in 1998 on Verve Records as additional part of his previous album The Boy's Doin' It.

Reception
A reviewer for Dusty Groove wrote, "Pure 70s genius from Hugh Masekela – a record that's quite different than his earlier Afro-soul styled albums, but somehow even better! The format here is much more straightly soulful – with larger arrangements and a strong vocal groove on a number of tracks – but Masekela's trumpet is still blasting firmly over the top of the tunes, infusing them with a soaring sense of soul that's really great! Rhythms change up nicely from the early days – getting complicated at times, and matching the seriousness of the message on the best tracks – and titles include 'Black Beauty', 'Makonko', 'You Told Your Mama Not To Worry', 'Hangover', 'Soweto Blues', and 'The Mandingo Man'."

A reviewer for Napster wrote: "Hugh Masekela's 1975 crossover album incorporated American pop and proto-Disco[sic] into his sound. You can also hear Funk influencing the angular, stuttering grooves and the heavily effected horns on the tracks. An excellent document of the ongoing cultural exchange between African and American popular music at the time, it's fun, danceable music as well."

Track listing

Personnel

Backing vocals – Julia Waters, Luther Waters, Maxine Waters, Oren Waters
Bass guitar – Ernie Baiddoo
Co-producer – Rik Pekonnen
Coordinator – Nga Machema
Drums – Frank Todd
Executive producer – Stewart Levine
Flugelhorn (uncredited) – Hugh Masekela
Guitar – Stanley Todd
Illustration – Henry Vizcarra
Percussion – Paulinho Da Costa
Photography – Ron Slenzak
Piano – Hugh Masekela
Producer – Hugh Masekela, Stanley Todd
Remix – Rik Pekonnen
Vocals – Christine Clinton, Elvin Brown, Hugh Masekela, Miriam Makeba, Richard Sirleaf, Stanley Todd

Notes on sleeve

Recorded at: Ambassador Records / Kumasi, Ghana
Remixed at: Hollywood Sound Studios
Mastered at: Allen Zentz Mastering, Hollywood
Conceived at: Ringway Hotel, Accra, Ghana

References

External links

1977 albums
Hugh Masekela albums
Casablanca Records albums